Curfew is a 1925 German silent drama film directed by Conrad Wiene and starring Harry Nestor, Cläre Lotto, and Fritz Kampers.

The film's art direction was by Max Knaake.

Cast
In alphabetical order

See also
 The Sergeant's Daughter (1952)

References

Bibliography

External links

1925 films
Films of the Weimar Republic
Films directed by Conrad Wiene
German silent feature films
Films set in the 1900s
German black-and-white films
German drama films
1925 drama films
Silent drama films
1920s German films
1920s German-language films